The year 1982 was the 201st year of the Rattanakosin Kingdom of Thailand, which celebrated its bicentenary on 6 April. It was the 37th year in the reign of King Bhumibol Adulyadej (Rama IX), and is reckoned as year 2525 in the Buddhist Era.

Incumbents
King: Bhumibol Adulyadej
Crown Prince: Vajiralongkorn
Prime Minister: Prem Tinsulanonda
Supreme Patriarch: Ariyavangsagatayana VIII

Events

Births

Deaths

References

 
Years of the 20th century in Thailand
Thailand
Thailand
1980s in Thailand